The following is a timeline of the history of the city of Yaoundé, Cameroon.

Prior to 20th century

 1888 - "Jaunde" settlement founded by German Georg August Zenker in colonial Kamerun.
 1895 - Trading post in business.

20th century
 1909 - Town designated capital of German colonial Kamerun.
 1911
 Charles Atangana appointed mayor.
  built.
 1916 - Town occupied by British and French forces.
 1921 - Yaounde designated administrative seat of colonial French Cameroon.
 1927 -  railway begins operating.
 1930 - Canon Yaoundé football club formed.
 1933 - Central Hospital of Yaoundé founded.
 1936 - Bastos (cigarette) manufactory begins operating.
 1939
 Central post office built.
 Population: 9,080.
 1951 - Mvog-Betsi Zoo founded.
 1952 - École professionnelle Charles-Atangana (school) built.
 1953 - Population: 36,786.
 1955
 Roman Catholic Metropolitan Archdiocese of Yaoundé active.
 Our Lady of Victories Cathedral dedicated.
 1956 -  elected mayor.
 1959 -  (college) founded.
 1961
 City becomes capital of independent Republic of Cameroon.
  (college) founded.
 Supreme Court of Cameroon headquartered in Yaoundé.
 1962
 University of Yaoundé opens.
 Population: 93,269.
 1964 - American School of Yaounde founded.
 1965 - University Teaching Hospital of Yaounde founded.
 1966 - National Library of Cameroon headquartered in city.
 1967 - Kondengui Central Prison built.
 1971 -  (college) founded.
 1972
 Bank of Central African States headquartered in Yaoundé.
 Ahmadou Ahidjo Stadium opens.
 National "centralization of government functions" leads to population increase Yaounde.
 1973 -  erected.
 1974
 Cameroon Tribune newspaper begins publication.
 Tonnerre Yaoundé football club formed.
 1976 - Population: 291,071.
 1985 - Yaoundé General Hospital built.
 1987
 Cameroon Radio Television headquartered in Yaounde.
 Population: 649,000.
 1988 -  (museum) active.
 1991 - Catholic University of Central Africa opens.
 1992 - International airport begins operating.
 1993 - University of Yaoundé I and University of Yaoundé II established.
 1998
 14 February: Yaoundé train explosion occurs.
 Blackitude Museum founded.
 1,293,000 (estimate).
 1999 - Afhemi Museum opens.

21st century
 2002 - Yaoundé Gynaecology, Obstetrics and Pediatrics Hospital opens.
 2004 - United Nations Development Fund for Women regional office headquartered in Yaounde.
 2005 - Population: 1,817,524.
 2006 - Basilique Marie-Reine-des-Apôtres (church) dedicated.
 2008 - February: 2008 Cameroonian anti-government protests; crackdown.
 2009
 March: Catholic pope visits city.
 Yaoundé Multipurpose Sports Complex opens.
 2016
 Paul Biya Stadium construction begins.
 Population: 2,873,567 (estimate).
 2019 - Part of 2019 Africa Cup of Nations football contest to be held in city.

See also
 Yaoundé history
 Timeline of Douala

References

This article incorporates information from the French Wikipedia and the German Wikipedia.

Bibliography

in English
  
 
 
 
 
  (Includes articles about Yaoundé)
 

in French
  
  
  (Includes bibliography)
 
  
 J.R. Ngambi et al., 2011, "La prolifération des décharges sauvages et leurs impacts socio-environnementaux dans la ville de Yaoundé", International Journal Advanced Studies and Research in Africa, 2011 Vol.2, N°1, 52-58.
  
  

in German

External links

 Items related to Yaoundé, various dates (via Europeana) (Images, etc.)
 Items related to Yaoundé, various dates (via Digital Public Library of America) (Images, etc.)
  (Bibliography)
  (Bibliography)
  (Bibliography)
  (Bibliography of open access  articles)
 

History of Yaoundé
Yaoundé
Cameroon history-related lists
Years in Cameroon
Yaounde